Abu Hamza meaning father of Hamza, is a given name and a common alias used by several people, it may refer to:

Given name
 Abu Hamza Rabia (died 2005), al-Qaeda leader 
 Abu Hamza al-Thumali (died 772), disciple of Ali al-Rida

Surname
 Mona Abou Hamze (née Abu Alwan; born 1968), Lebanese TV personality and presenter

Alias
 Zabiuddin Ansari, Lashkar-e-Taiba militant involved in 2008 Mumbai attacks, known as Abu Hamza
 Mahmoud al-Majzoub (1965–2006), leader of the Palestinian Islamic Jihad
 Abu Hamza al-Masri (born Mustafa Kamel Mustafa in 1958), Egyptian Muslim cleric, former imam of Finsbury Park mosque in London, imprisoned in the US
 Faheem Khalid Lodhi (born 1969), Australian convicted of militancy, known as Abu Hamza
 Samir Mohtadi, Australian Muslim cleric known as Abu Hamza
 Abu Hamza al-Muhajir (1968–2011), leader of Al-Qaeda in Iraq

Arabic masculine given names